Fabiano Lako is a South Sudanese footballer who plays as a midfielder. He made his senior debut for South Sudan national football team in the 2013 CECAFA Cup.

References

Living people
South Sudanese footballers
South Sudan international footballers
Association football midfielders
Year of birth missing (living people)